This is list of recipients of the Nishan-e-Imtiaz, listed in chronological order.
The Nishan-e-Imtiaz is one of the state organized civil decorations of Islamic Republic of Pakistan.

It is awarded for achievements towards world recognition for Pakistan or outstanding service for the country. However, the award is not limited to citizens of Pakistan and, while it is a civilian award, it can also be awarded to military personnel and worn on the uniform. Nishan, translates as Decoration/Order, is a highly restricted and prestigious award roughly equivalent to Presidential Medal of Freedom (United States) and Order of the British Empire (United Kingdom), and is the first category award of Order of Imtiaz. The other three descending categories are Hilal-i-Imtiaz, Sitara-i-Imtiaz and Tamgha-e-Imtiaz. Usually, it is regarded as the highest award one can achieve in Pakistan since the higher award Nishan-e-Pakistan is awarded only to foreign Heads of States.

List

Notes

References 

Civil awards and decorations of Pakistan